Stay Tooned! Unsweetened Multi-Game Experience! is a 1996 action-adventure video game that was developed by Funnybone Interactive and published by Sierra On-Line. In the game, the player must navigate through the apartment complex to find the TV remote to zap rogue cartoon characters back into TV Land.

Plot
The game begins in a large apartment building in the middle of an unnamed city. The player takes the place of an ordinary patron living in an apartment. The player starts off simply channel-surfing with a TV remote and watching short cartoons and commercials that parody real-life shows. The shows parodied include Seinfeld, which is parodied as Whinefeld. One channel has the game's chief programmer providing hints on how to play the upcoming game.

Several cartoon characters either forbid or encourage the player to push the red button on their remote as the player surfs the channels. When the player pushes the button, the cartoons break out of the television set, steal the remote, and cause the entire apartment complex to go into animated form. The player must recover the television remote, which is the only thing that can zap the escaped toons and send them back to TV Land, the fictional toon world found within the depths of the television. The player searches the other apartments for the remote while playing nearly thirty games contained within them and avoiding the destructive trickery committed by the escaped toons.

At the end, all the toons are back in the TV, but at the last second, Pixel warns Chisel that they can't let the player get away with this. Chisel grabs the player into the TV. The player lands into the Cartoon world and is turned into a toon as well.

Characters
The first five characters mentioned are the five toons you have to capture at the end of the game. The others serve as background characters. Most of the toons are against you, but some will help you in the game.

Chisel: Chisel is a blue cat and wears a red cap. He is the most destructive of the toons, as he loves throwing explosives such as dynamite at everything he can, including the player. He is Pixel's twin brother.
Pixel: Pixel is the group's unofficial leader and the other cat in the group, as well as Chisel's twin sister. She's a pink perfectionist and always wears a purple shirt. She's very mature, although she's prone to irritability and temper tantrums. She is almost as destructive as Chisel and the smartest in the group. She is the subject of Schmooze's affections, feelings she does not return.
Fiddle: Fiddle is a black and white cat. Fiddle is tall, skinny, and the most cowardly of the five toons. He is constantly chased by another anthropomorphic cat named Katrina, who has a huge crush on him. He is the least destructive of the toons and is the only one of the five who openly supports the player's efforts to find the remote and zap them home. 
Schmooze: Schmooze is a short, orange anthropomorphic dog, and the most irritable of the toons. He's somewhat selfish and obnoxious, and hates the other dog in the group, Scoops. He is recognizable by his black bowler hat and red vest. He often has fantasies about being a rich sultan and is deeply in love with the group's leader, Pixel. Schmooze could be a bulldog.
Scoops: Scoops is the other dog in the group and arguably the most hyperactive and cheerful in the group. He often annoys Schmooze and has an obsessive love for gravy. He has an unusually good singing voice.
Frank: Frank is a heavily built up human toon who hates the other toons. He can be either the player's ally or enemy. He acts very tough and loves to pick fights.
Dr. Pickles: Dr. Pickles is a mad scientist bent on world domination. He conducts very painful experiments on the other toons and has the strange ability to open his head to his brain.
Mrs. Findley: Mrs. Findley is a middle-aged woman who is usually grouchy and a heavy smoker. She lives in Apartment 5D on the fifth floor, with her cats and lazy husband.
Katrina: Katrina is a tall white cat who adores Fiddle. She seeks to marry him and often attacks him with kisses. She is neutral in the player's fight against the toons.
Killtron: Killtron is the Magic Death Robot and an occasional enemy of the player. He only shows up in the vast hallways or at the Kartoon Kombat! game. 
Al Extrabux: An obvious parody of Alex Trebek on the game show Schleopardy! (Also a parody of Jeopardy!).

Others
Purple Glop: He is literally purple glop who often is seen making things messy for the player.
Überbug: A German bug who seeks to take control of the player's fridge with his bug army.
Mr. Fishy: A proper, somewhat irritable herring.
Ben: The game's lead programmer; he often breaks the fourth wall and appears in hidden areas.
Penguins: Very temperamental extras.
Cable Guy, Pizza Delivery Guy and Policeman: Three ordinary men who look exactly alike. You can call them on the phone on the first floor. Only the Cable Guy and the Policeman do anything useful. The Policeman (Obviously) loves doughnuts.

Gameplay
The player navigates through twenty rooms located on five floors. The basement, attic, and several hidden rooms are also accessible. There are thirty rooms to play in, but some don't appear in all of the games you play and almost none of them appear in the same place twice in a row. These rooms all have keys to them, but you have to search for them since the toons stole them all; you can also collect random items that may be useful later.

Running the game on modern systems
For people attempting to play the game on PC running Windows 2000, XP, Vista, or 7, it is highly improbable due to the highly different structures of earlier operating systems. The game will run, however for Microsoft Virtual PCs with earlier versions of Windows. Macintosh users will likely find similar problems trying to run the game on the most recent versions of macOS, as the Classic function has been discontinued.

Reception

References

Bibliography

External links
Official Website

1996 video games
Action-adventure games
Classic Mac OS games
Funnybone Interactive games
Parody video games
Sierra Entertainment games
Single-player video games
Video games about parallel universes
Video games developed in the United States
Windows games